A Mercy is Toni Morrison's ninth novel. It was published in 2008. Set in colonial America in the late 17th century, it is the story of a European farmer, his purchased wife, and his growing household of indentured or enslaved white, Native American, and African characters. It made the New York Times Book Review list of "10 Best Books of 2008" as chosen by the paper's editors. In Fall 2010 it was chosen for the One Book, One Chicago program.

Synopsis 
Florens, a slave, lives and works on Jacob Vaark's rural New York farm. Lina, a Native American and fellow laborer on the Vaark farm, relates in a parallel narrative how she became one of a handful of survivors of a smallpox plague that destroyed her tribe. Vaark's wife Rebekka describes leaving England on a ship for the new world to be married to a man she has never seen. The deaths of their subsequent children are devastating, and Vaark accepts a young Florens from a debtor in the hopes that this new addition to the farm will help alleviate Rebekka's loneliness. Vaark, himself an orphan and poorhouse survivor, describes his journeys from New York to Maryland and Virginia, commenting on the role of religion in the culture of the different colonies, along with their attitudes toward slavery.

All these characters are bereft of their roots, struggling to survive in a new and alien environment filled with danger and disease. When smallpox threatens Rebekka's life, Florens, now 16, is sent to find a black freedman who has some knowledge of herbal medicines. Her journey is dangerous, ultimately proving to be the turning point in her life.

Morrison examines the roots of racism going back to slavery's earliest days, providing glimpses of the various religious practices of the time, and showing the relationship between men and women in early America that often ended in female victimization. They are "of and for men", people who "never shape the world, The world shapes us". As the women journey toward self-enlightenment, Morrison often describes their progress in Biblical cadences, and by the end of this novel, the reader understands the significance of the title, "a mercy".

Reviews

References

External links
Publisher's page
Interview on the book 

2008 American novels
Novels by Toni Morrison
African-American novels
Alfred A. Knopf books
Novels about American slavery
Fiction set in the 1690s
Novels set in New York (state)